An electronic parking brake (EPB), also known as an electric parking brake or electric park brake, is an electronically controlled parking brake, whereby the driver activates the holding mechanism with a button and the brake pads are electrically applied to the rear wheels. This is accomplished by an electronic control unit (ECU) and an actuator mechanism. There are two mechanisms that are currently in production, Cable puller systems and Caliper integrated systems.  EPB systems can be considered a subset of Brake-by-wire technology.

First installed in the 2001 BMW 7 Series (E65), electronic parking brakes have since appeared in a number of vehicles.

Functionality
Apart from performing the basic vehicle holding function required of park brakes, the EPB systems provide other functions like automatic release of the park brakes when the driver presses the accelerator or slips the clutch, and re-clamping using additional force on detection of vehicle motion. Further, the hill-hold function, which applies brakes to prevent roll-back when pulling away on a gradient, can also be implemented using the EPB.

Implementation
The implementation of the control logic for the actuators is carried out by either using a stand-alone ECU or by integrating it in the ECU for electronic stability control.

Standards
The design of electric park brakes in the United States should be compliant with:
FMVSS 105
FMVSS 135
ECE 13H

References

Automotive technologies
Vehicle safety technologies